The Francis Thompson Site, denoted by Smithsonian trinomial 16 MA 112, is an archeological site in Madison Parish, Louisiana in the vicinity of Delhi.  It was listed on the National Register of Historic Places on October 8, 1991.

The site has yielded prehistoric pottery and other artifacts from several cultures.

See also
National Register of Historic Places listings in Madison Parish, Louisiana

References

National Register of Historic Places in Louisiana
Madison Parish, Louisiana
Archaeological sites in Louisiana